Richards is an unincorporated community and census-designated place (CDP) in eastern Grimes County, Texas, United States.  The community is located on Farm roads 1486 and 149. The Chicago, Rock Island and Pacific Railroad line passes the east side of the community and Lake Creek flows past to the east.

Education
The Richards Independent School District, Montgomery Independent School District and Anderson-Shiro Consolidated School District serve area students.

Climate
The climate in this area is characterized by hot, humid summers and generally mild to cool winters.  According to the Köppen Climate Classification system, Richards has a humid subtropical climate, abbreviated "Cfa" on climate maps.

References

https://tshaonline.org/handbook/online/articles/hlr16

External links

Census-designated places in Grimes County, Texas
Census-designated places in Texas
Unincorporated communities in Texas
Unincorporated communities in Grimes County, Texas